Experiment is a census-designated place (CDP) in Spalding County, Georgia, United States.  The population was 3,233 at the 2000 census.

History
Experiment is named for the University of Georgia Agricultural Experiment Station located there. Experiment has been noted for its unusual place name.

The community was heavily damaged by an EF3 tornado on January 12, 2023. The tornado injured 18 people along its path.

Geography
Experiment is located at  (33.274505, -84.274758), immediately north of Griffin and approximately 30 miles (48.3 km) south-southeast of Atlanta.

Climate

Demographics

As of the census of 2000, there were 3,233 people, 1,163 households, and 839 families residing in the CDP. The racial makeup of the CDP was 45.50% White, 52.55% African American, 0.15% Native American, 0.03% Asian, 0.53% from other races, and 1.24% from two or more races. Hispanic or Latino of any race were 1.24% of the population.

There were 1,163 households, out of which 34.7% had children under the age of 18 living with them, 35.9% were married couples living together, 30.4% had a female householder with no husband present, and 27.8% were non-families. 23.7% of all households were made up of individuals, and 11.1% had someone living alone who was 65 years of age or older.  The average household size was 2.72 and the average family size was 3.16.

In the CDP, the population was spread out, with 30.6% under the age of 18, 10.1% from 18 to 24, 25.1% from 25 to 44, 20.2% from 45 to 64, and 14.1% who were 65 years of age or older.  The median age was 31 years. For every 100 females, there were 82.0 males.  For every 100 females age 18 and over, there were 74.0 males.

The median income for a household in the CDP was $25,078, and the median income for a family was $27,139. Males had a median income of $27,447 versus $19,194 for females. The per capita income for the CDP was $11,255.  About 26.9% of families and 26.2% of the population were below the poverty line, including 41.2% of those under age 18 and 3.5% of those age 65 or over.

References

External links 

Census-designated places in Spalding County, Georgia
Census-designated places in Georgia (U.S. state)